Jerry York (born July 25, 1945) is an American former ice hockey coach who was the men's ice hockey coach at Boston College. York is the winningest coach in NCAA hockey, and leads the all-time list as the only Division I head coach with over 1,000 wins. He has won the NCAA Division I Men's Ice Hockey title five times as a coach, at Bowling Green State University in 1984 and at Boston College in 2001, 2008, 2010 and 2012, tying him with Murray Armstrong for second-most all-time behind only Vic Heyliger (6). York received the Spencer Penrose Trophy for being named Division I Coach of the Year in 1977. On June 25, 2019, York was elected into the Hockey Hall of Fame in the Builders Category.

Background 
The eighth of ten children, York is a "Triple Eagle", having graduated from Boston College High School in 1963 and Boston College in 1967, as well as earning a Master's degree from Boston College.

Coaching career 
York's coaching career began at Clarkson as an assistant coach. In 1972, York became the head coach when he took over the job from Len Ceglarski who had accepted the head coaching job at BC.  York coached at Clarkson for 7 years, winning the ECAC regular season title in 1977.

In 1979 York moved from Clarkson to Bowling Green, taking over from Ron Mason.  In 15 seasons at the school, he compiled nine 20-win seasons, 4 CCHA regular-season titles, 1 CCHA tournament title, 6 NCAA tournament appearances, and a National Title in 1984.

York returned to his alma mater, Boston College, in 1994, and began rebuilding the program.  In the 1997–98 season, Boston College surprised the college hockey world by reaching the NCAA title game.  In 27 years, York has led the Eagles to eleven Hockey East regular-season titles in 2001, 2003, 2004, 2005, 2011, 2012, 2014, 2016, 2017, 2018, and 2020, nine Hockey East tournament titles in 1998, 1999, 2001, 2005, 2007, 2008, 2010, 2011, and 2012, nine Beanpot titles in 2001, 2004, 2008, 2010, 2011, 2012, 2013, 2014, and 2016, eighteen NCAA tournament appearances, twelve Frozen Four appearances and four national titles. The four championships came in 2001 by beating North Dakota]], 2008 over Notre Dame, 2010 against Wisconsin, and in 2012 defeating Ferris State University.  His 2001 title was BC's first national title since 1949, and only the second in the storied program's then 81-year history. York's Boston College teams have had twelve Frozen Four appearances in fifteen years from 1998 to 2016. During that span, Boston College has played in the national championship game eight times. Boston College lost four national title games – to Michigan in 1998, to North Dakota in 2000, to Wisconsin in 2006, and to Michigan State in 2007.

During the 2014–15 season at Boston College, York passed legendary John "Snooks" Kelley, whom he played under as a student-athlete, for most programs win all-time at Boston College. Kelley had 501 victories for the Eagles.

York became the winningest men's college ice hockey coach in history after passing Ron Mason's 924 wins on December 29, 2012.

On January 22, 2016, York earned his 1000th career win as a head coach, becoming the first coach in NCAA Division I ice hockey history to reach this milestone. He again achieved a new milestone of 1,100 wins on January 23, 2021.

After coaching his 28th year at Boston College and 50th year overall in the NCAA, York announced his retirement on April 14, 2022.

Head coaching record

Awards and honors

Personal life
York is married to fellow Boston College graduate Bobbie (née O'Brien). They have two adult children.

See also
List of college men's ice hockey coaches with 400 wins

References

External links
 Coach Bio: Jerry York – bceagles.com

1945 births
American ice hockey coaches
Boston College Eagles men's ice hockey players
Boston College High School alumni
Bowling Green Falcons ice hockey coaches
Clarkson Golden Knights men's ice hockey coaches
Boston College Eagles men's ice hockey coaches
Hockey Hall of Fame inductees
Ice hockey coaches from Massachusetts
Lester Patrick Trophy recipients
Living people
People from Watertown, Massachusetts
Sportspeople from Middlesex County, Massachusetts
AHCA Division I men's ice hockey All-Americans
Ice hockey players from Massachusetts